Craps (After Hours) is the second album by American comedian Richard Pryor, released in 1971 on the Laff Records label. It was released during the comedian's transitional period from a middlebrow "Cosbyized" comic into a more improvisational, socially conscious, controversial brand of raw humor that Pryor would help to pioneer during the 1970s. Several monologues from the album were repeated for a film recorded the same year, Live & Smokin', although it would be held from release until 1985 as a VHS videotape. Recorded at Redd Foxx's club in Hollywood, Pryor is introduced by the emcee as "the crown prince of comedy".

For some unknown reason, possibly a mix up at the record producer, some LPs were pressed with a comic referred to as Hotshot Hogan on the B-side.

Side two of this album was later re-released in a split LP with Redd Foxx, "Pryor Goes Foxx Hunting" (Laff A170).

Track listing
Side one
"Gettin' High"
"Fuck from Memory"
"Big Tits"
"Gettin' Some"
"The President" (later reissues as "President Nixon")
"Ass Hole"
"The Line-Up"
"Masturbating"
"Religion"
"Black Preachers"
"Being Born"
"Blow Our Image"
"Blackjack"
Side two
"I Spy Cops"
"Sugar Ray"
"White Folks"
"Indians"
"Ass Wupin"
"Got a Dollar?"
"Pres.'s Black Baby"
"Dope"
Wino Panthers"
"After Hours"
"280 Pound Ass"
"Crap Game"
"Insurance Man"
"Black and Proud"
"Gettin the Nut"
"F–k the Faggot"
"Jackin' Off"
"Snappin' Pussy"
"Fartin'"

References

1971 albums
Richard Pryor albums
Laff Records albums